Morrison's or Morrisons may refer to:

 Morrisons, a chain of supermarkets in the United Kingdom
 Morrisons, New Zealand, a settlement in Otago, New Zealand
 Morrison's Academy, a Scottish school in Crieff, Perth and Kinross
 Morrison's Cafeteria, a southeastern United States restaurant chain
 Morrisons Cove, a valley in Pennsylvania, United States
 Morrison's Haven, a Scottish harbour in East Lothian
 Morrisons Hill, New South Wales, a former railway halt in Australia

See also
 List of organisations with Morrison in their name
 Morrison (disambiguation)
 Morrisson (disambiguation)